RMS Laconia was a Cunard ocean liner built by Swan Hunter & Wigham Richardson, launched on 27 July 1911, with the wife of the U.S. Ambassador Mrs. Whitelaw Reid christening the vessel. Laconia was delivered to the Cunard Line on 12 December 1911, and began service on 20 January 1912. She was the first Cunard ship of that name. She was torpedoed and sunk on 25 February 1917 during World War I; 12 passengers were killed.

Laconia was intended for the Liverpool-Boston service with cruising from New York to the Mediterranean off season. The ship was the first British ship and first North Atlantic liner to be equipped with anti-roll tanks.

Drafted into war service

On the outbreak of World War I, Laconia was converted into an armed merchant cruiser in 1914. She was fitted with eight  guns and for a time she carried two seaplanes, which were housed on the quarterdeck. She was based at Simon's Town, South Africa in the South Atlantic, from which she patrolled the South Atlantic and Indian Ocean until April 1915. She was then used as a headquarters ship stationed at Zanzibar and engaged in operations for the capture of Tanga and the colony of German East Africa. She was mainly employed on patrol duties but on one occasion, was engaged at the bombardment of Tanga. She continued to serve on the East Africa station, and made several trips from Durban and Cape Town with troops for the army in British East Africa. Laconia returned home to the UK with a convoy in June 1916, with a large shipment of gold ingots from Cape Town, and was paid off at Devonport.

Returned to Cunard

She was handed back to Cunard in July 1916 and on 9 September resumed service.

The first torpedo struck the liner on the starboard side just abaft the engine room, but did not sink her. 20 minutes later a second torpedo exploded in the engine room, again on the starboard side, and the vessel sank at 10:20 pm. A total of 12 people were killed; six crew and six passengers. Two of the killed passengers were American citizens, Mrs. Mary Hoy and her daughter, Miss Elizabeth Hoy, who were originally from Chicago. The death of the Hoys stirred up public opinion in America against the Germans, and raised public support for the United States entering the war.

Chicago Tribune reporter Floyd Gibbons was aboard Laconia when she was torpedoed and gained fame from his dispatches about the attack, his graphic account of the sinking read to both Houses of Congress and was credited with helping to push the United States into joining the war.

Rediscovery

In March 2009, it was announced that the wreck of Laconia was located in November 2008 and claimed by Odyssey Marine Exploration, Inc., a commercial archaeology company in Tampa, Florida. "Britain claims it is the legitimate owner of the wrecks because, under a wartime insurance scheme, it paid the owners of the vessels when they sank, in effect making the remains the property of the taxpayer." The search for the wreck was featured on an episode of Discovery Channel's Treasure Quest titled "The Silver Queen". Items salvaged were 852 bars of silver and 132 boxes of silver coins worth an estimated £3m. One of the artifacts recovered during their investigation of the wreck happened to be the remains of a left shoe that likely belonged to one of the ship's female passengers.

References

Bibliography

External links
 
 
 
 
 
 

1911 ships
World War I Auxiliary cruisers of the Royal Navy
Maritime incidents in 1917
Ships built by Swan Hunter
Ships of the Cunard Line
Ships sunk by German submarines in World War I
Shipwrecks of Ireland
World War I cruisers of the United Kingdom
World War I passenger ships of the United Kingdom
World War I shipwrecks in the Atlantic Ocean